Senator Farrow may refer to:

Margaret Farrow (born 1934), Wisconsin State Senate
Paul Farrow (born 1964), Wisconsin State Senate